Electra Havemeyer Webb (August 16, 1888 – November 19, 1960) was a collector of American antiques and founder of the Shelburne Museum.

Early life
Electra Havemeyer was born on August 16, 1888. She was the youngest child of Henry Osborne Havemeyer (1847–1907), President of the American Sugar Refining Company, and Louisine Elder (1855–1929). She had two older siblings, Adaline Havemeyer (1884–1963), who married Peter Hood Ballantine Frelinghuysen, and Horace Havemeyer (1886–1956), who married Doris Dick Havemeyer.

Her paternal grandparents were Frederick Christian Havemeyer Jr. (1807-1891), and Sarah Louise Henderson Havemeyer (1812-1851).  Her maternal grandparents were merchant George W. Elder (1831–1873) and his wife, Matilda Adelaide Waldron (1834–1907).

She attended Miss Spence's School and traveled with her family to the American West, France, Italy, Spain, Egypt, Greece and Austria, but did not attend college.

Career
During World War I, Electra Webb drove an ambulance in New York City, and was named Assistant Director of the Motor Corps. In 1942, during World War II she joined the Civilian Defense Volunteer Organization, and directed the Pershing Square Civil Defense Center and its blood bank.

Collector
Although she spent her youth among the finest examples of European and Asian material culture, Electra Havemeyer Webb's own collecting took a radical turn.  Although she lived with more than twenty extremely fine Impressionist works from her parents' collection in a penthouse at 740 Park Avenue during part of the year, she decorated a small pink farmhouse on  portion of her in-laws' estate with the simple New England furniture and craftwork.  Quilts, tiger maple furniture, and hooked rugs filled the homey rooms of her country house.  Although a woman of tremendous means, Webb's Vermont home was modest and comfortable in scale.  Her "Brick House" survives today as a rare and intact example of the Colonial Revival, providing an intimate glimpse into the life of a pioneer collector of America and founder of the Shelburne Museum.  The home was in the Webb family until 2000 when the structure and its contents were acquired by the museum. Following a 4.4 million dollar campaign by the museum to restore the home to Mrs. Webb's decor, the museum  was recognized by Preservation Trust of Vermont in 2005 for their efforts in preserving the Brick House. Since 2004, it has been open to the public by reservation for guided tours during the summer months.

Shelburne Museum

The closing of one of the Webb's other homes, this one near the polo grounds at Old Westbury, unintentionally birthed a museum.  The question of what would become of her cigar store Indians, hunting decoys, and weather vanes had to be settled.  In 1947 Electra Havemeyer Webb gathered with her friends to create Shelburne Museum.   Located near Route 7 in Shelburne, Vermont, Webb's museum became a haven for the handmade objects of another era.  A two-hundred-year-old tavern shelters one of the finest collections of weathervanes, trade signs, and primitive portraits on the continent.  A rambling old farmhouse is filled with spectacular assemblages of mochaware, pewter, and staffordshire.  The finest collection of carriages and sleighs in North America rests in a unique horseshoe barn.  Period homes, filled with outstanding collections of early American furniture and accessories, dot the grounds.

Rather than confine her eclectic collections to a single modern gallery, Webb chose to create an institution that would showcase her "collection of collections" in fine examples of early American homes and public buildings.  A general store, meeting house, log cabin, and a steamship dot the grounds.  The entire museum reflects Electra Webb's passion for American art and design, as she treasured a variety of objects.  Five rooms from her Park Avenue apartment were installed in a memorial building after her death in 1960, bringing Webb's collection of works by Monet, Manet, and Degas to the museum grounds.  A large pastel by Mary Cassatt, showing a young Electra Havemeyer with her mother Louisine, enjoys a place of honor in the entry hall.

Electra Havemeyer Webb began to collect "in earnest" in 1911, more than a decade before the founding of Colonial Williamsburg and nearly a half century before authentic American antiques would return to the major rooms of the White House.  When she began to gather the remnants of an earlier America there was no National Register of Historic Places.  Americans had yet to understand that their heritage was interesting and worthy of preservation.  Before there was Henry Francis du Pont's Winterthur, Henry Ford's Greenfield Village, or even the American Wing at the Metropolitan Museum in New York, Webb was an ambitious and well-known collector of Americana.  She worked with the finest antique dealers of the era, including Edith Halpert and Harry Newman, to assemble encyclopedic and irreplaceable collections of American material culture.  The honesty of everyday objects spoke to Webb, and she used her significant resources to ensure their preservation.  Today the museum's Americana collection is one of the world's finest.

Deaccession Controversy
In 1996 the museum sold $30 million of her artwork, deemed non-essential to the collection, which had been in storage not visible to the public for years. This was to create a collections care endowment, to better preserve and secure the items in the collection.  While the board had considered other ways to care for the items, including mergers and loaning out the collection, the final choice received some backlash in the art community. The president of the American Association of Museums refused to endorse the move arguing that the museum was unfairly conflating care for the items with security, while the director at the time argued it set a dangerous precedent for other museums doing the same. Electra Webb's son, James Watson Webb, Jr. went on the record saying that he was disappointed with the move as well. Most of the buyers were unidentified telephone bidders, but one item was sold to Stephen A. Wynn with the intent of displaying it at the Bellagio Casino.

Personal life
In 1910, Electra married polo champion James Watson Webb II (1884–1960) of the Vanderbilt family in an elaborate society wedding at St. Bartholomew's Episcopal Church, New York. He was a son of William Seward Webb and Eliza Osgood Vanderbilt. They had five children:

 Electra Webb (1910–1982)
 Samuel Webb (1912–1988)
 Lila Webb(1913–1961)
 James Watson Webb, Jr. (1916–2000)
 Harry Webb (1922–1975).

Recognizing her achievements in the museum field, Yale University awarded Electra Havemeyer Webb an honorary Master of Arts degree in 1956.  She was the fifth woman to be recognized in this manner.

She died on November 19, 1960 at Mary Fletcher Hospital in Burlington, Vermont.

Shelburne Farms
Electra's parents-in-law Dr. William Seward Webb and Eliza Osgood Vanderbilt had transformed a collection of rambling lakeside farms on the shore of Vermont's Lake Champlain into a model country estate. The core of property, the Shelburne Farms, survives today as a nonprofit foundation dedicated to fostering innovative agricultural practices. Recalling her first visit to the Webb estate as a young girl, Webb declared: "I felt as though I was in dreamland"; she was smitten by the beauty of Vermont's Champlain Valley. On the Webb estate she enjoyed horseback riding, the 113-foot steam yacht and one of America's first private nine-hole golf courses. The pastoral landscape and lush grounds of Shelburne Farms would be replicated at Electra Havemeyer Webb's museum. Shelburne Museum is well known for its fine collection of lilacs, peonies and New England perennials.

See also
Havemeyer
Electra Havemeyer Webb Memorial Building
Vanderbilt family

References

Further reading
 Electra Havemeyer Webb Biography in "The Influences Behind the Shelburne Museum" at Academics Content Server at Saint Michael's College
 "Electra's Cultural Jewel at Shelburne Museum" in Vermont Woman Magazine, 2004
 "'Collector's gene' yields a trove of Americana: Electra Webb made Shelburne Museum her monument" in The Boston Globe
Women's History: Electra Havemeyer Webb
 Danilov, Victor J. Women and museums: a comprehensive guide. Rowman Altamira, 2005
 Karp, Walter, "Electra Webb and Her American Past", American Heritage, April/May 1982 (33:3)
 Rothstein, Edward, "Critic's Notebook: The Art of Collecting Collections", The New York Times, May 20, 2011.
 Hewes, Lauren B. and Celia Y. Oliver. To Collect in Earnest: The Life and Work of Electra Havemeyer Webb. Shelburne, Vermont: Shelburne Museum, 1997.
 Gere, Charlotte and Marina Vaizey. Great Women Collectors. London: Philip Wilson, 1999.
 Saarinen, Aline B. The Proud Possessors: The Lives, Times and Tastes of Some Adventurous American Art Collectors. New York: Random House, 1958.

Webb, Electra Havemeyer
Women art collectors
Havemeyer family
American people of German descent
1888 births
1960 deaths
Museum founders
Webb, Electra Havemeyer
Spence School alumni